Paul Rebeyrolle (3 November 1926 in Eymoutiers – 7 February 2005 in Côte-d'Or) was a French painter.

Life and works
As a child he had tuberculosis of the bone, which caused for long periods of immobility. Later he studied in Limoges and joined the French Communist Party. He ultimately broke with the party because of events related to the Hungarian Revolution of 1956.

His art is often concerned with landscapes, but is marked by violence and rage. He received praise from François Pinault, Jean-Paul Sartre, Michel Foucault and others. Some of his famous works are called "Frogs" 1966, "Still Life" 1966, and "Trout" 1956.

Where to see his works
Rebeyrolle has his own Museum, the "Espace Paul Rebeyrolle", located near his birthplace, in Eymoutiers (30 miles east of Limoges).

References

20th-century French painters
20th-century French male artists
French male painters
21st-century French painters
21st-century French male artists
1926 births
2005 deaths
Prix Fénéon winners